Captain Howdy was an alternative rock band formed by Mark Kramer and Penn Jillette that existed between 1992 and 1997. The group disbanded in 1997 when Penn relocated to Las Vegas.

Discography
They released two albums, the first of which was Tattoo of Blood (1994) featuring Deborah Harry (Blondie) on two tracks, guitarist Billy West (Futurama/Ren & Stimpy) on the same two tracks and cellist Soma Allpass Hammarlund throughout. The title track was written by Lou Reed after he heard Penn's story  about getting an inkless tattoo. Cover art was by Tony Fitzpatrick.

The second album, Money Feeds My Music Machine (1997), features the return of Billy West plus the addition of Bill Bacon  on percussion and "Tess" supplying vocals to the song "Man Bites Dog". Cover art was again by Tony Fitzpatrick with additional art by Reneé French.

Singles
 Captain Howdy - The Best Song Ever Written

References 

 "Wired" story that mentions the "Tattoo of Blood"
 Captain Howdy page at pennandteller.com
 Kramer's MySpace account
 Tattoo of Blood album info from Kramer's record company
 Money Feeds My Music Machine album info from Kramer's record company

Musical groups established in 1992
Musical groups disestablished in 1997
Rock music groups from New York (state)